Brian Regal is an American historian of science, skeptic and writer. He is an associate professor of the history of science at Kean University in New Jersey.

Regal is the author of an encyclopedia of pseudoscience, as well as Searching for Sasquatch: Crackpots, Eggheads and Cryptozoology, a scholarly study on cryptozoology. He has also written on the history of the Jersey Devil.

Early life
Regal grew up in Newark's Ironbound neighborhood, in a Catholic family. He developed an early interest for science and the mysterious, which he attributes to television series such as Jonny Quest and later In Search of....

Discouraged from pursuing higher education by a high school guidance counselor ("kids like you don't go to college"), Regal joined the armed forces, serving as a tank commander.

Academic career

Going to college after his military career, he graduated with a B.A. in History from Kean University in 1995, then a M.A. in American History and Literature at Drew University (1996) and a Doctorate in Modern History and Literature from Drew University (2001). He teaches at Kean University, where he holds the title of Associate Professor for the History of Science, Technology and Medicine.

Regal has long been interested on how theories of human evolution have been received by the public and by religious authorities. His first two books, Henry Fairfield Osborn: Race and the Search for the Origins of Man and Human Evolution: A Guide to the Debates, explore that theme.

In 2005, he realized that Grover Krantz's estate donated his notes and papers to the Smithsonian Institution after his death in 2002, where they remained unread. Within the collection, Regal found a significant amount of source documents on the founding of American cryptozoology. Those documents were the starting point for The Secret History of the Jersey Devil.

As of 2021, he was working on a book about various alternative theories of Europeans coming to North America before Christopher Columbus and how those theories relate to the sociopolitical context of the period when they appear.

He is a member of the history journal Endeavour.

Publications

Books
 
 
 
 
 
 
 
 

Selected Papers

References

American skeptics
American male writers
Living people
Year of birth missing (living people)
Kean University faculty
21st-century American historians
American historians of science